Suhasini Maniratnam (born 15 August 1961) known mononymously as Suhasini, is an Indian actress, director, producer and writer in the Tamil film industry. She has worked as an actress in Tamil, Telugu, Malayalam and Kannada films. She made her cinematic debut with the 1980, Tamil film. Nenjathai Killathe. Suhasini then won National Film Award for Best Actress for her performance in Sindhu Bhairavi (1985). Suhasini has won 4 Filmfare Awards, 2 Kerala State Awards, 2 Tamilnadu State Awards and 2 Nandi Awards.

Early life 

Her paternal cousins Anu Hasan, Shruti Haasan and Akshara Haasan have also since become actresses.

Suhasini attended the Municipal Elementary School in Paramakudi, before moving to Madras aged 12 to live with her grandmother and uncle Kamal Haasan.

Film career

As an actress

She made her film debut in 1980 with the Tamil movie Nenjathai Killathe. In her first movie itself, she won the Tamil Nadu State Film Award for Best Actress. She was introduced to Malayalam cinema through Padmarajan's Koodevide (1983), which also featured Mammootty. She appeared in the AFI Fest nominated feature film Vanaprastham (1999), which starred Mohanlal. 

She has acted with Vishnuvardhan in  Bandhana (1984), Suprabhatha (1988), Muthina Haara (1990), Himapatha (1995), Hendithghelthini (1998), Maathaad Maathaadu Mallige (2007) and School Master (2010).

She won the National Film Award for Best Actress for her role in the 1985 Tamil film Sindhu Bhairavi, directed by K. Balachander.

She has worked in Swathi (1984), Manivathoorile Aayiram Sivarathrikal Ezhuthapurangal (1987), Amrutha Varshini (1997), Nuvvu Naaku Nachav (2001), Theerthadanam (2001) and Gabbar Singh (2012) among others.

As a director
In 1991, Suhasini directed the anthology mini-series Penn (1991) shown on Madras Doordarshan. The series featured eight standalone episodes examining the lives of South Indian women, and starred several of her contemporaries such as Shobana, Revathi, Raadhika and Amala as protagonists.

Her film Indira was shown in film festivals globally in countries including Belarus and Japan. In November 1997, Suhasini directed a short television film titled Swayamvaram featuring Suchitra Krishnamoorthi and Rajiv Menon . The script had been written by Sujatha and commissioned by Revathi and Suresh Menon.

Suhasini directed a segment titled "Coffee, Anyone?" in Amazon Prime's Putham Pudhu Kaalai (2020). Shot during the COVID-19 pandemic, the segment was set against the backdrop of the 21-day COVID-19 lockdown in March 2020 in India, and featured Suhasini in the leading role alongside her cousins Shruti Haasan and Anu Hasan, and her mother Komalam.

Other work
Suhasini and her husband Mani Ratnam have been involved in the running of their production company Madras Talkies since 1997.

Honorary Consul 
Suhasini was appointed the Honorary Consul Of the Grand Duchy Of Luxembourg in 2015. She held the post until 2020.

Goodwill and Brand Ambassador

Naam Foundation 
Suhasini founded Naam Foundation in 2010 with the objective to empower single women.

Personal life 
Suhasini married film director Mani Ratnam on 26 August 1988 and the couple has a son, Nandan, born in 1992.

Awards 

National Film Awards
 Best Actress – Sindhu Bhairavi (Tamil) (1986)

Filmfare Awards South
 Best Actress – Kannada – Benkiyalli Aralida Hoovu (1983)
 Best Actress – Telugu – Swati (1984)
 Best Actress – Kannada – Suprabhatha (1988)
 Best Actress – Kannada – Muthina Haara (1990)

 Kerala State Film Awards
 Best Actress – Ezhuthapurangal (1987)
 Best Actress – Theerthadanam (2001)

Tamil Nadu State Film Awards
 Best Actress – Nenjathai Killathe (1980)

Nandi Awards
 Best Actress – Swati (1984)
 Best Supporting Actress – Nuvvu Naaku Nachav (2001)

South Indian International Movie Awards
 Best Actress in a Supporting Role – Kannada – Sachin! Tendulkar Alla (2014)

Filmography

Kannada

Telugu

Tamil

Malayalam

English

Hindi

Television 
 Hasini Pesum Padam (Jaya TV) as Host
 Autograph (Jaya TV) as Host
 Weekend with Stars (Zee Tamil TV) as Host
 Ninaivu Kurippugal (DD Podhigai) as Host
 Bigg Boss 4 (Star Vijay) as Herself and Guest
 Modern Love Hyderabad (2022; Amazon Prime Video)

References

External links 

 
 Suhasini on MFC

Actresses in Malayalam cinema
Actresses in Telugu cinema
Tamil film directors
Tamil-language film directors
Indian women film directors
Tamil screenwriters
Kerala State Film Award winners
1961 births
Living people
Indian atheists
Indian Tamil people
Actresses in Tamil cinema
Tamil Nadu State Film Awards winners
Filmfare Awards South winners
Best Actress National Film Award winners
M.G.R. Government Film and Television Training Institute alumni
Indian film actresses
Nandi Award winners
20th-century Indian actresses
21st-century Indian actresses
20th-century Indian film directors
21st-century Indian film directors
Indian women screenwriters
Actresses from Chennai
Tamil actresses
Hindi screenwriters
20th-century Indian women writers
20th-century Indian dramatists and playwrights
21st-century Indian women writers
21st-century Indian writers
21st-century Indian dramatists and playwrights
Film directors from Chennai
Screenwriters from Chennai
Women writers from Tamil Nadu
Actresses in Tamil television
Actresses in Telugu television
Actresses in Kannada cinema
Tamil television directors
Tamil television producers
Tamil television writers